The Embassy of Mexico in Canada, based out of Ottawa, is the primary diplomatic mission from the United Mexican States to Canada.

Relations between the two nations were formally established on 30 January 1944, with Mexico eventually opening a consulate in Montreal in 1952. This consulate was later upgraded to an embassy and moved to Ottawa.

Location 
The Embassy is located at 45 O´Connor Street, Suite 1000, Ottawa, Ontario.

Ambassadors 
The following is a list of Ambassadors from Mexico to Canada since the formation of relations:

Consulates 
Mexico also maintains three consulates general, two consulates and four honorary consulates in Canada:

Additionally, the following government secretariat departments also maintain attaché offices in the Ottawa Embassy:
 Secretariat of National Defense (Military and Air Attaché Office)
 Secretariat of the Navy (Naval Attaché Office)
 Secretariat of the Economy

See also 
Canada–Mexico relations
Embassy of Canada, Mexico City
Foreign relations of Canada
Foreign relations of Mexico
List of diplomatic missions of Mexico
Mexican Secretariat of Foreign Affairs

References

External links 
Mexican Ministry of Foreign Affairs
Embassy of Mexico in Canada (in English and Spanish)

Mexico
Ottawa
Canada–Mexico relations